The Ignacio Berriochoa Farm near Dietrich, Idaho, has two lava rock structures built in c.1920 by Basque stonemason Ignacio Berriochoa. It was listed on the National Register of Historic Places in 1983.

References

Basque-American culture in Idaho
Basque-American history
Buildings and structures completed in 1920
Buildings and structures in Lincoln County, Idaho
Farms on the National Register of Historic Places in Idaho
National Register of Historic Places in Lincoln County, Idaho